EarlyShares is an online platform for real estate fundraising and investing. It was founded in 2011 and is headquartered in Miami, Florida.

History
EarlyShares was founded in 2011 by Stephen Temes, Maurice Lopes, Heather Schwarz, and Renee Caputi.

EarlyShares launched in April 2012 as a platform for rewards-based crowdfunding campaigns. After the SEC implemented rules for general solicitation in September 2013, EarlyShares began hosting equity investment offerings for accredited investors. In 2014, EarlyShares began focusing solely on real estate crowdfunding investments.

Joanna Schwartz joined EarlyShares as CEO in May 2013.

Milestones
In 2012, EarlyShares  produced “a nationwide road tour, offering free workshops about exactly what crowdfunding is, how to do it and the ramifications of it”.

In September 2012, EarlyShares acquired HelpersUnite, a donation based crowdfunding portal dedicated to cause related projects, for an undisclosed sum.

That month, EarlyShares became the "key sponsor" of the Small Business Challenge, a competition for businesses with fewer than 100 employees and entrepreneurs with startup ideas that are seeking to raise capital through crowdfunding. The competition is designed to "reward companies that show the most potential for job creation".

In November 2013, EarlyShares launched its first equity offering for BoatSetter.

In February 2014, EarlyShares partnered with Crowdnetic to expand the distribution network for their investment offerings. EarlyShares offerings in ‘private issuers publicly raising’ are viewable on MarketWatch.com.

Awards and Recognitions

EarlyShares has received the Crowdfunding Accreditation for Platform Standards (CAPS) from crowdsourcing.org

In August 2012, Worth Magazine named EarlyShares one of its Top 10 Crowdfunding Sites.

References

Crowdfunding platforms of the United States
Financial services companies established in 2011
Companies based in Miami